Susan Harper (born 1953 in Toronto, Ontario) is a senior Canadian diplomat with the Ministry of Foreign Affairs. She served as Canadian Ambassador to Uruguay from 2001 to 2004.  She served as Chair of the Arctic Council from 2014 – 2015.

Harper joined Foreign Affairs Canada in 1983. She has been on posting to Yaoundé, Paris, Washington D.C., and Buenos Aires.  She served as President of the Professional Association of Foreign Service Officers, the organization that represents Canada's professional diplomats.

Harper is an alumna of Queen's University and Ivey School of Business at University of Western Ontario, where she obtained an MBA in 1983. She is a polyglot and speaks English, French, and Spanish.

In January 2016, Harper was appointed as Consul General of Canada in Miami, Florida.

References

Living people
Queen's University at Kingston alumni
1952 births
Ambassadors of Canada to Uruguay
University of Western Ontario alumni
People from Toronto
Canadian women ambassadors